Juan de Acosta is a municipality and town in the Colombian department of Atlántico.

References

External links
 Gobernacion del Atlantico - Juan de Acosta
 Juan de Acosta official website

Municipalities of Atlántico Department